William II of Baux (died 1239) was a son of William of Baux.  Following his father, William II carried the title of prince of Orange.  The title had come to the House of Baux through a brother, Raimbaut of Orange, of William II's paternal grandmother, Tiburge de Sarenom, the latter also referred to as Tiburge princess of Orange.

References

1239 deaths
House of Baux
Princes of Orange
Year of birth unknown